Sunderland Association Football Club,  are a professional football club based in Sunderland, North East England. They were announced to the world by the local newspaper, The Sunderland Daily Echo and Shipping Gazette on 27 September 1880 as Sunderland & District Teachers Association Football Club following a meeting of the Teachers at Rectory Park school in Sunderland on 25 September 1880. The football club changed their name to the current form on 16 October 1880, just 20 days after the September announcement. They were elected into The Football League in the 1890–91 season, becoming the first team to join the league since its inauguration in the 1889–90 season, replacing Stoke F.C.

Transfers

All figures are based on the maximum potential fee and are correct as at 1 September 2013.

In

Out

Honours and achievements 
Sunderland have won a total of six Football League Championships including three in the space of four seasons, along with being runners-up five times. Sunderland have also experienced success in the FA Cup, winning it twice; in 1937 and 1973. They have never won the League Cup but finished as finalists in 1985 and 2014.

League 
First Division (level 1):
Winners (6): 1891–92, 1892–93, 1894–95, 1901–02, 1912–13, 1935–36
Runners-up (5): 1893–94, 1897–98, 1900–01, 1922–23, 1934–35
Football League Championship (level 2):
Winners (2): 2004–05, 2006–07
Second Division (level 2):
Winners (1): 1975–76
Runners-up (2): 1963–64, 1979–80
Promotion (1): 1989–90
First Division (level 2):
Winners (1): 1995–96, 1998–99
Third Division (level 3):
Winners (1): 1987–88

Cup 
FA Cup:
Winners (2): 1937, 1973
Finalists (2): 1913, 1992
Football League Cup:
Finalists (2): 1985, 2014
FA Charity Shield:
Winners (1): 1936
Finalists (1): 1937
Sheriff of London Charity Shield:
Winners (1): 1903
Football League War Cup:
Finalists (1): 1942
Durham Challenge Cup:
Winners (4): 1884, 1887, 1888, 1890, 
Northern Temperance Festival Cup: 
Winners (1): 1884,
Durham and Northumberland Championship:
Winners (1): 1888
British Cup: 
Runners Up (1): 1902
Dewar Sheriff of London Shield:
Winners (1): 1903
Newcastle and Sunderland Hospitals Cup:
Winners (3): 1912, 1913, 1914
Runners Up (1): 1911
Durham Senior Cup:
Winners (11): 1919, 1923, 1924, 1927, 1929, 1931, 1932, 1935, 1936, 1937, 1939
Runners Up (3): 1925, 1926, 1928   
Northern Victory League:
Runners Up (1): 1919
North East Counties Cup:
Winners (2): 1920, 1921
Northumberland and Durham Challenge Cup:
Runners Up (1): 1883

Player records

Appearances 
Youngest first-team player: Derek Forster, 15 years 185 days (Leicester City, 22 August 1964).
Oldest first-team player: Jermain Defoe, 39 years 121 days (against Doncaster Rovers, 5 February 2022).

Most appearances 
Competitive matches only. Each column contains appearances in the starting eleven, followed by appearances as substitute in brackets.

Goalscorers

Top goalscorers 
Competitive matches only, appearances including substitutes appear in brackets.

 Most Hat Tricks: Dave Halliday – 12 (11 league and 1 cup)

Managerial records 

 First full-time manager: Tom Watson managed the club for 191 matches, from August 1888 to August 1896.
 Longest serving manager: Bob Kyle managed the club for 817 matches, from August 1905 to May 1928, a total of 23 years.

Club records

Goals 
Most league goals scored in a season: 109 (in 42 matches in the 1955–56 season, First Division).
Fewest league goals scored in a season: 21 (in 38 matches in the 2002–03 season, Premier League).
Most league goals conceded in a season: 97 (in 42 matches in the 1957–58 season, First Division).
Fewest league goals conceded in a season: 26 (in 34 matches in the 1900–01 season, First Division).

Points 
Most points in a season:
Two points for a win: 61 (in 42 games in the 1963–64 season, Second Division).
Three points for a win: 105 (in 46 games in the 1998–99 season, First Division).
Fewest points in a season:
Two points for a win: 23 (in 22 games in the 1890–91 season, The Football League) and (in 30 games in the 1896–97 season, First Division).
Three points for a win: 15 (in 38 games in the 2005–06 season, Premier League).

Matches

Firsts 
First match: Sunderland 0–1 Ferryhill, 13 November 1880.
First competitive match: Sunderland 2–2 Burnopfield in the Durham Challenge Cup, 11 December 1880.
First league match: Sunderland 2–3 Burnley, 13 September 1890.
First FA Cup match: Redcar 3–1 Sunderland, 8 November 1884.
First League Cup match: Brentford 4–3 Sunderland, 26 October 1960.
First European match: Vasas Budapest 0–2 Sunderland, 19 September 1973, UEFA Cup Winner's Cup.

Record wins 

Record Football League win:1-9 (v. Newcastle United (a) 5 Dec 1908)
Record FA Cup win:11-1 (v. Fairfield FC, 2 February 1895)
Record Football League Cup win:0-7 (v. Cambridge United, 1 October 2002)
Record Football League Trophy win:8-1 (v. Aston Villa U21, 8 September 2020)
Record friendly win:23-0 (v. Castletown FC, 20 December 1884)

Record defeats 
Record league defeats:
8–0 (v. Sheffield Wednesday, 26 December 1911).
8–0 (v. West Ham United, 19 October 1968).
8-0 (v. Watford, 25 September 1982)
8-0 (v. Southampton, 18 October 2014)
Record FA Cup defeat:
5-1 (v. Manchester United, 9 March 1964)
Record Football League Cup defeat:
6-0 (v. Derby County, 31 October 1990)
Record Football League Trophy defeat:
3-0 (v. Scunthorpe United, 12 November 2019)

Attendances

Overall 
Highest overall attendance: 75,118 v. Derby County, FA Cup 6th Round Replay, 8 March 1933 at Roker Park (Sunderland 0 – 1 Derby County)
Highest league attendance: 68,004 v. Newcastle United, 4 March 1950 at Roker Park (Sunderland 2 - 2 Newcastle United)
Lowest recorded attendance: 880 vs Millwall, Friendly, 28 July 1969 at Roker Park (Sunderland 0 – 1 Millwall)
Lowest recorded league attendance: 3,841 vs. Manchester City, 11 April 1934 at Roker Park (Sunderland 0 – 0 Manchester City)
Lowest approximate competitive attendance: c. 1,500 vs. Birtley Town, Durham Challenge Cup First Round, 20 November 1886 at Newcastle Road (Sunderland 2 – 0 Birtley)
Lowest recorded competitive attendance: 3,498 vs. Oldham Athletic, EFL Trophy Second Round, 1 December 2021 at Stadium of Light (Sunderland 0 – 1 Oldham Athletic)

Competitive Attendance Records by Ground 
Attendances at Sunderland's grounds prior to Newcastle Road were rarely recorded. Attendances at Newcastle Road, and in the seasons prior to 1925 at Roker Park were usually approximations.

European statistics

Record by season 
Below is Sunderland's record in European competitions. They have only appeared once in European competition, during the 1973–74 season where they reached the second round. They qualified for the UEFA Cup Winners' Cup after winning the 1973 FA Cup Final over Leeds United.

Key
 PR = Preliminary round
 1R = First round
 2R = Second round
 3R = Third round
 QF = Quarter final
 SF = Semi final
 F = Final

Record by competition

Notes 

A. : Payment of the transfer fee for Ricardo Alvarez was imposed on Sunderland in 2017 following the loss of a legal dispute with Inter Milan. The total cost of the Alvarez deal, including compensation and court fees is estimated to be close to £20m.
B. : Sunderland were promoted in the 1989–90 season despite being beaten in the 1990 play-off final, Swindon Town originally won the match 1–0 but Sunderland took their place in the First Division after Swindon admitted to making illegal payments.
C. : Sunderland score is given first in each result.
D. : Sunderland qualified for the 1973–74 European Cup Winners' Cup by winning the 1973 FA Cup.

Footnotes and references 
Footnotes:

References:

External links 
Sunderland AFC – Statistics, History and Records

Statistics
Sunderland